Mictopsichia buenavistae is a species of moth of the family Tortricidae. It is found in Bolivia.

The wingspan is about 18 mm. The ground colour of the forewings is orange cream, but orange along the costa and tinged brownish medially. The hindwings are pale orange with some black dots at the apex.

References

Moths described in 2009
Mictopsichia
Moths of South America
Taxa named by Józef Razowski